The Marco Polo Bridge Incident, also known as the Lugou Bridge Incident or the July 7 Incident, was a battle during July 1937 in the district of Beijing between China's National Revolutionary Army and the Imperial Japanese Army. 

Since the Japanese invasion of Manchuria in 1931, there had been many small incidents along the rail line connecting Beijing with the port of Tianjin, but all had subsided. On this occasion, a Japanese soldier was temporarily absent from his unit opposite Wanping, and the Japanese commander demanded the right to search the town for him. When this was refused, units on both sides were alerted and the Chinese Army fired on the Japanese Army, though the missing Japanese soldier had already returned to his lines. The Marco Polo Bridge Incident is generally regarded as the start of the Second Sino-Japanese War, and arguably World War II.

Name 
In English, the battle is usually known as the "Marco Polo Bridge Incident". The Marco Polo Bridge is an eleven-arch granite bridge, an architecturally significant structure first erected under the Jin dynasty and later restored during the reign of the Kangxi Emperor of the Qing dynasty in 1698. It gained its Western name from its appearance in Marco Polo's record of his travels.

This is the common name for the event in Japanese (Rokōkyō Jiken) and is an alternate name for it in Chinese and Korean (Nogugyo Sageon). The same name is also expressed or translated as the "", "Lugouqiao", or "Lukouchiao".

Background 
Tensions between the Empire of Japan and the Republic of China had been heightened since the Japanese invasion of Manchuria in 1931 and their subsequent creation of a client state, Manchukuo, with Puyi, the deposed Qing dynasty Emperor, as its chief of state. After the invasion, Japanese forces extended their control further into northern China, seeking to obtain raw materials and industrial capacity. A commission of inquiry from the League of Nations published the Lytton Report which was critical of the Japanese, resulting in Japan quitting the League.

The Kuomintang (KMT) government of China refused to recognize Manchukuo but did agree to the Tanggu Truce with Japan in 1933. Subsequently, there were various "incidents", or armed clashes of a limited nature, followed by a return to uneasy peace. The significance of the Marco Polo Bridge Incident is that following it, tensions did not subside again; instead, there was an escalation, with larger forces committed by both sides and fighting spreading to other parts of China. With hindsight, this small incident can, therefore, be regarded as the start of a major conflict.
 
By the terms of the Boxer Protocol of 7 September 1901, China had granted nations with legations in Beijing the right to station guards at twelve specific points along railways connecting Beijing with Tianjin. This was to ensure open communications between the capital and the port. By a supplementary agreement on 15 July 1902, these forces were allowed to conduct maneuvers without informing the authorities of other nations in China.By July 1937, Japan had expanded its forces in China to an estimated 7,000 to 15,000 men, mostly along the railways. This number of men, and the amount of concomitant matériel, was several times the size of the detachments deployed by the European powers, and greatly in excess of the limits set by the Boxer Protocol. By this time, the Imperial Japanese Army had already surrounded Beijing and Tianjin.

Incident 
On the night of 7 July, the Japanese units stationed at Fengtai crossed the border to conduct military exercises. Japanese and Chinese forces outside the town of Wanping—a walled town 16.4 km (10.2 mi) southwest of Beijing—exchanged fire at approximately 23:00. The exact cause of this incident remains unknown. When a Japanese soldier, Private Shimura Kikujiro, failed to return to his post, Chinese regimental commander Ji Xingwen (219th Regiment, 37th Division, 29th Army) received a message from the Japanese demanding permission to enter Wanping to search for the missing soldier; the Chinese refused. Although Private Shimura returned to his unit (he claimed that he was suffering from stomach ache, had to find immediate relief in the darkness and got lost), by this time both sides were mobilizing, with the Japanese deploying reinforcements to surround Wanping.

Later that night, a unit of Japanese infantry attempted to breach Wanping's walled defenses but were repulsed. An ultimatum by the Japanese was issued two hours later. As a precautionary measure, Qin Dechun, the acting commander of the Chinese 29th Route Army, contacted the commander of the Chinese 37th Division, General Feng Zhian, ordering him to place his troops on heightened alert. 

At 02:00 in the morning of 8 July, Qin Dechun, executive officer and acting commander of the Chinese 29th Route Army, sent Wang Lengzhai, mayor of Wanping, alone to the Japanese camp to conduct negotiations. However, this proved to be fruitless, and the Japanese insisted that they be admitted into the town to investigate the cause of the incident.

At around 04:00, reinforcements of both sides began to arrive. The Chinese also rushed an extra division of troops to the area. At 04:45 Wang Lengzhai had returned to Wanping, and on his way back he witnessed Japanese troops massing around the town. Within five minutes of Wang's return, a shot was heard, and both sides began firing, thus marking the commencement of the Battle of Beiping-Tianjin, and, by extension, the full scale commencement of the Second Sino-Japanese War at 04:50 on 8 July 1937.

Colonel Ji Xingwen led the Chinese defenses with about 100 men, with orders to hold the bridge at all costs. The Chinese were able to hold the bridge with the help of reinforcements, but suffered tremendous losses. At this point, the Japanese military and members of the Japanese Foreign Service began negotiations in Beijing with the Chinese Nationalist government.

A verbal agreement with Chinese General Qin was reached, whereby:
 An apology would be given by the Chinese to the Japanese.
 Punishment would be dealt to those responsible.
 Control of Wanping would be turned over to the Hopei Chinese civilian constabulary and not to the Chinese 219th Regiment.
 The Chinese would attempt to better control "communists" in the area. 
This was agreed upon, though Japanese Garrison Infantry Brigade commander General Masakazu Kawabe initially rejected the truce and, against his superiors' orders, continued to shell Wanping for the next three hours, until prevailed upon to cease and to move his forces to the northeast.

Aftermath 
Although a ceasefire had been declared, further efforts to de-escalate the conflict failed, largely due to actions by the Chinese Communists and the Japanese China Garrison Army commanders. Due to constant Chinese attacks, Japanese Garrison Infantry Brigade commander General Masakazu Kawabe ordered Wanping to be shelled on 9 July. The following day, Japanese armored units joined the attack. The Chinese 219th regiment staged an effective resistance, and full scale fighting commenced at Langfang on 25 July. After launching a bitter and bloody attack on the Japanese lines on the 27 July, General Sung was defeated and forced to retreat behind the Yongding River by the next day.

Battle of Beiping–Tianjin 

On 11 July, in accordance with the Goso conference, the Imperial Japanese Army General Staff authorized the deployment of an infantry division from the Chōsen Army, two combined brigades from the Kwangtung Army and an air regiment composed of 18 squadrons as reinforcements to Northern China. By 20 July, total Japanese military strength in the Beiping-Tianjin area exceeded 180,000 personnel.

The Japanese gave Sung and his troops "free passage" before moving in to pacify resistance in areas surrounding Beijing and Tianjin. After 24 days of combat, the Chinese 29th Army was forced to withdraw. The Japanese captured Beiping and the Taku Forts at Tianjin on 29 and 30 July respectively, thus concluding the Beiping-Tianjin campaign. However, the Japanese Army had been given orders not to advance further than the Yongding River. In a sudden volte-face, the Konoe government's foreign minister opened negotiations with Chiang Kai-shek's government in Nanking and stated: "Japan wants Chinese cooperation, not Chinese land." Nevertheless, negotiations failed to move further. On 9 August 1937, a Japanese naval officer was shot in Shanghai, escalating the skirmishes and battles into full scale warfare.

The 29th Army's resistance (and poor equipment) inspired the 1937 "Sword March", which—with slightly reworked lyrics—became the National Revolutionary Army's standard marching cadence and popularized the racial epithet guizi to describe the Japanese invaders.

Consequences 

The heightened tensions of the Marco Polo Bridge Incident led directly to full-scale war between the Empire of Japan and the Republic of China, with the Battle of Beiping–Tianjin at the end of July and the Battle of Shanghai in August.

In 1937, during the Battle of Beiping–Tianjin the government was notified by Muslim General Ma Bufang of the Ma clique that he was prepared to bring the fight to the Japanese in a telegram message. Immediately after the Marco Polo Bridge Incident, Ma Bufang arranged for a cavalry division under the Muslim General Ma Biao to be sent east to battle the Japanese. Ethnic Turkic Salar Muslims made up the majority of the first cavalry division which was sent by Ma Bufang.

7 July 1937 is sometimes given as an alternative starting date for World War II (as opposed to the more commonly-cited date of 1 September 1939, when Germany invaded Poland, starting the European theatre of the war).

In 1987, the bridge was renovated and the People's Anti-Japanese War Museum was built near the bridge to commemorate the anniversary of the start of the Sino-Japanese War.

Controversies 
There is debate over whether the incident could have been planned like the earlier Mukden Incident, which served as a pretext for the Japanese invasion of Manchuria. According to Jim Huffman this notion has been "widely rejected" by historians, as the Japanese would likely have been more concerned over the threat posed by the Soviets. Controversial conservative Japanese historian Ikuhiko Hata has suggested that the incident could have been caused by the Chinese Communist Party, hoping it would lead to a war of attrition between the Japanese army and the Kuomintang. However, he himself still considers this less likely than the "accidental shot" hypothesis, that the first shot was fired by a low-ranking Chinese soldier in "an unplanned moment of fear".

Order of battle

National Revolutionary Army (Kuomintang) 

In comparison to their Japanese counterparts, the 29th Route Army, and generally all of the NRA for that matter, was poorly equipped and under-trained. Most soldiers were armed only with a rifle and a dao (a single-edged Chinese sword similar to a machete). Moreover, the Chinese garrison in the Lugouqiao area was completely outnumbered and outgunned; it consisted only of about 100 soldiers.

Imperial Japanese Army 

The Japanese China Garrison Army was a combined force of infantry, tanks, mechanized forces, artillery and cavalry, which had been stationed in China since the time of the Boxer Rebellion. Its headquarters and bulk for its forces were in Tianjin, with a major detachment in Beijing to protect the Japanese embassy.

See also 

 Marco Polo Bridge
 Huanggutun incident (1928)
 Jinan incident (1928)
 Second Sino-Japanese War
 Japanese invasion of Manchuria
 Mukden Incident (1931)
 January 28 Incident (Shanghai, 1932)
 Defense of the Great Wall (1933)
 Battle of Shanghai (1937)
 Battle of Nanking (Nanjing, 1937)
 National Revolutionary Army
 "The Sword March"

References

Citations

Sources

External links 

 International Military Tribunal Proceedings
 The Marco Polo Bridge Virtual Tour and Photographs
 Bridge described
  Japanese soldiers in the Marco Polo Bridge (Japanese)
  Marco Polo Bridge Incident – July 7, 1937

Battles of the Second Sino-Japanese War
Combat incidents
Conflicts in 1937
1937 in China
1937 in Japan
Military history of Beijing
20th century in Beijing
July 1937 events